Imam al-Ajurri was an Islamic scholar from 10th century (4th century AH). He came from Darb al-Ajurr in western Baghdad, after studying with many scholar in Iraq he moved to Mecca and start teaching there. He lived in Mecca for 30 years until he died there in 970 / 320 AH. Al-Ajurri commonly known as Shafi'is scholar, while Ibn Abi Ya'la stated he is a Hanbali. Among his teacher is Al-Hafiz Abul Muslim Ibrahim bin Abdillah bin Muslim Al-Bashri Al-Kajji (d.292 H) and also Abu Bakr Abd-allah bin Sulayman bin Al-Ash’ath As-Sijistani (d.316 H) one of sheikh in Baghdad, the son of Imam Abu Dawud of Sunan Abu Dawud. While one of his famous student is Abu Nu'aym al-Asbahani who transmitted hadith from him.

His Writings

Al-Ajurri wrote many books, even many of them were lost, some surviving work still published today. Some of his writing are:
 Kitāb al-Sharīʻah.  One of his important book.
 Akhlāq al-ʻulamāʼ 
 Kitāb al-arbaʻīn ḥadīthan 
 Akhlāq ḥamalat al-Qurʼān 
 Akhlāq ahl al-Qurʼān 
 Kitāb al-taṣdīq bi-al-naẓar ilá Allāh taʻālá fī al-ākhirah 
 Taḥrīm al-nard wa-al-shiṭranj wa-al-malāhī 
 Akhbār Abī Ḥafṣ ʻUmar ibn ʻAbd al-ʻAzīz wa-sīratuh 
 Dhamm al-liwāṭ ,
 Kitāb al-ghurabāʼ, etc.

Acknowledgment
Ibn Khallikan says:"He was Shafi'i jurist and a muhaddith, he is the author of famous book Al-Arba'in. He was a righteous and pious man."
Al-Dhahabi says:" The Imam, the Muhaddith, he was the Imam of the grand Mosque in Makkah (Imam al-Haram); a truthful, charitable and a pious man, a man of exemplary character."

References 

Bibliography
  Al-Ajurri, Abu Bakr, Kitab Ash-Shariah pg.5

Shafi'is
Hanbalis
Hadith scholars
People from Baghdad
10th-century jurists